Stahl Stenslie is a Norwegian born artist working with cognition and perception manipulative projects. He has produced and exhibited interactive media artworks including cyberSM (1993), sense:less (1996), Solve et Coagula(1997), The Leap, World Ripple (2008) and The Blind Theatre (2009).

Education
Oslo School of Architecture and Design (PhD), Statens Kunstakademi (Oslo, Norway), The Düsseldorf Art Academy (Düsseldorf,  Germany), Academy of Media Arts Köln (Cologne, Germany)

Exhibits
2009
•	Theatre of the Blind, Nationaltheateret, Oslo
•	Walking the Line, performances, SKC center, Beograd, Serbia
•	Serpents Tongue, performance with Kate Pendry, SKC center, Beograd, Serbia
2008
•	World Ripple # 2,  Touch Me Festival, Zagreb, Croatia
•	Artgasm, Touch Me Festival, Zagreb, Croatia 
•	Artgasm, Beton Halla, Beograd, Serbia
•	Chador Touch; World Ripple, Bagh-e-Tehran Park, Tehran, Iran
•	Invisible Sculptures: World Ripple, The Association of Norwegian Sculptors, Oslo, Norway
•	Ecstatic Bodies, Gallery 13 Kubikova, Bratislava, Slovakia (13m3.sk/)
2006
•	Solve et Coagula touch suit, Spiel mit Technik, Deutsches Technikmuseum Berlin
2005
•	S.U.F.I. suicide fashion, Touch Me festival, Zagreb, Croatia
2004
•	Post Digital Lunch, Dutch Electronic Art Festival (DEAF), V2, Rotterdam, Holland http://framework.v2.nl/archive/archive/node/actor/all.xslt/nodenr-66263
•	Inter_Skin II, The Nova Gallery, Zagreb, Croatia
2003
•	Erotogod 3.5 at Dutch Electronic Art Festival, V2, Rotterdam, Holland
•	Erotogod, Atelier Nord, Oslo, Norway
2002
•	Tactile technology, cyberSM, Deutsche Hygiene Museum, Dresden, Germany
•	Stunt Club, Kunstnernes Hus, Oslo, Norway
•	Suicidal Fashion, Break 21, Dead or Alive @ Kapelica, Ljubljana, Slovenia
2001
•    Erotogod, Henie Onstad Kunstsenter, Norway
•    CyberSM, Deutsches Hygiene Museum, Dresden, Germany
2000
•    The Leap, at The Norwegian Nationaltheater, Oslo,  The Ibsen Festival 2000.
•    "Wie man sieht", Museum Ludwig, Cologne, Germany
•    "Stoneproof", Økomuseum Boarderland, Halden, Norway
1999
•    The Leap, The Artists House, Oslo Norway
1997
•	Solve et Coagula, Ars Electronica, Linz, Austria
•	5th International Biennial, Istanbul, Turkey
•	e~on, Kunstnernes Hus, Oslo, Norway
1992 -96
•	DEAF, Dutch Electronic Art Festival, Rotterdam, Holland
•	Electra, Henie Onstad Kunstsenter, Norway
•	Du + You, Gallerie Schipper - Krome, Cologne, Germany

References

External links
Homepage:
Medienkunstnetz
Some Quotes
Stahl at Kontejner 2008
V2 archives
In Roy Ascott's Engineering nature

1965 births
Living people
Norwegian artists